The 1891 Victorian Football Association season was the 15th season of the Australian rules football competition.

The premiership was won by the Essendon Football Club. It was the first premiership in the club's history, and it was its first premiership out of a sequence of four consecutive premierships won from 1891 to 1894.

Ladder 

Teams did not play a uniform number of premiership matches during the season. As such, in the final standings, each team's premiership points were adjusted upwards proportionally to represent a 22-match season – e.g., Essendon played 20 matches, so its tally of premiership points was increased by a factor of 22/20. After this adjustment, there was no formal process for breaking a tie.

Notable events 
 Prior to the season, the distance between each goalpost and its adjacent kick-off post (behind post) was reduced from ten yards to seven yards, making each behind face the same width as the goal face, and establishing the modern measurements for the scoring area which have remained since.
 On 11 July, a torrential downpour from 3:00am saw the VFA grounds in Melbourne left at least partially underwater and made the conditions almost unplayable:
Despite both teams' players, captains and officials objections to playing, the umpire overruled them and the match proceeded, with St Kilda (who had a full team of 20 players) winning by 10.5 to nil.

See also 
 Victorian Football Association/Victorian Football League History (1877-2008)
 List of VFA/VFL Premiers (1877-2007)
 History of Australian rules football in Victoria (1853-1900)

References 

Victorian Football League seasons
Vfa Season, 1891